Deh Sheykh-e Pataveh (also Romanized as Deh Sheykh-e Pātāveh; also known as Deh Sheykh) is a village in Pataveh Rural District, Pataveh District, Dana County, Kohgiluyeh and Boyer-Ahmad Province, Iran. At the 2006 census, its population was 1,285, in 248 families.

References 

Populated places in Dana County